Taekwondo competitions at the 2019 Parapan American Games in Lima were held for the first time from August 30 to 31 at the Callao Regional Sports Village.

Medal table

Medalists

Men's events

Women's events

References

External links
 Taekwondo

2019 Parapan American Games